Milvydai (Melvidai, Milvidai, formerly) is a village in Kėdainiai district municipality, in Kaunas County, in central Lithuania. According to the 2011 census, the village had a population of 45 people. There are an airstrip, a milk buying post and old cemetery of the Goštautai family.

History
At the beginning of the 20th century there were Milvydai village and Milvydai estate (a property of the Goštautai).

Demography

References

Villages in Kaunas County
Kėdainiai District Municipality